Who? is a 1974 British science fiction film based on the 1958 novel of the same name by Algis Budrys. It was directed by Jack Gold and stars Elliott Gould, Trevor Howard and Joseph Bova. Some video releases were retitled The Man in the Steel Mask or Roboman.

Synopsis
An enigmatic individual with a metal face is returned from East Germany and claims to be Lucas Martino, an American scientist who was working on a top-secret project but was severely injured and scarred in a car crash. American authorities hold him in custody while they try to establish whether the man is the real Martino or an impostor looking for secret information about the ultimate rocket project developed in the West.

Cast
 Elliott Gould as Sean Rogers
 Trevor Howard as Colonel Azarin
 Joseph Bova as Lucas Martino

Release
Although one 1983 British source stated that the film was shelved for five years after its completion in 1974, contemporary sources indicate the film was screened theatrically in the U.S. in 1975, and broadcast on British television in 1976.

Reception
Contemporary U.S. reviews were mixed to negative. The Iowa Gazette described it as "distinctly average but better than mediocre".  The Kentucky Courier-Journal dismissed it as a "clinker", calling it an "inane... funereal mess".

References

External links
 

1974 films
1970s science fiction films
British science fiction films
Allied Artists films
1970s mystery films
Films based on science fiction novels
Films directed by Jack Gold
Films scored by John Cameron
British mystery films
British Lion Films films
Films based on American novels
Films set in East Germany
Films set in West Germany
Cold War films
1970s English-language films
1970s British films